No. 131 (County of Kent) Squadron RAF was a Royal Air Force Squadron formed to be a bomber unit in World War I and reformed as a fighter unit in World War II.

History

Formation and World War I
No. 131 Squadron Royal Flying Corps was formed on 1 March 1918 and became a unit of the Royal Air Force, but it disbanded on 17 August 1918 without becoming operational.

Reformation in World War II
The squadron reformed in 1941 at RAF Ouston as a fighter unit equipped with Spitfires and then provided air defence for convoys from RAF Atcham and Llanbedr in Wales. It moved to India in October 1944. The squadron re-assembled at Amarda Road on 5 February 1945 but its Spitfires were re-allocated to the Royal Indian Air Force and the squadron was disbanded on 10 June 1945. Sixteen days later, 134 Squadron was renumbered to 131 and was equipped with Thunderbolts to begin training to support the invasion of Malaya. It was disbanded on 31 December 1945 at Kuala Lumpur, Malaysia.

Aircraft operated

References

External links

 History of No.'s 131–135 Squadrons at RAF Web
 131 Squadron history on the official RAF website

131
131
Military units and formations established in 1918
1918 establishments in the United Kingdom